Raymond J. Lill (July 26, 1913 – April 7, 1977) was an American politician who served in the New York State Assembly from the 131st district from 1967 to 1976.

He died of a heart attack on April 7, 1977, in Reno, Nevada at age 63.

References

1913 births
1977 deaths
Democratic Party members of the New York State Assembly
20th-century American politicians